Heterogeneous nuclear ribonucleoprotein G is a protein that in humans is encoded by the RBMX gene.

Function 

This gene belongs to the RBMY gene family which includes candidate Y chromosome spermatogenesis genes. This gene, an active X chromosome homolog of the Y chromosome RBMY gene, is widely expressed whereas the RBMY gene evolved a male-specific function in spermatogenesis. Pseudogenes of this gene, found on chromosomes 1, 4, 9, 11, and 6, were likely derived by retrotransposition from the original gene. Alternatively spliced transcript variants encoding different isoforms have been identified but their biological nature has not been determined.

Interactions 

RBMX has been shown to interact with SFRS10 and CDC5L.

Model organisms 

Model organisms have been used in the study of RBMX function. A conditional knockout mouse line called Rbmxtm2b(KOMP)Wtsi was generated at the Wellcome Trust Sanger Institute. Male and female animals underwent a standardized phenotypic screen to determine the effects of deletion. Additional screens performed:  - In-depth immunological phenotyping

References

Further reading